María Moczó is one of the forty subbarrios of Santurce, San Juan, Puerto Rico.

Demographics
In 2000, María Moczó had a population of 1,964.

In 2010, María Moczó had a population of 1,627 and a population density of 40,675 persons per square mile.

See also
 
 List of communities in Puerto Rico

References

Santurce, San Juan, Puerto Rico
Municipality of San Juan